97.7 Love Radio (DZLT 97.7 MHz) is an FM station owned by Manila Broadcasting Company and operated by Star East Production & Marketing Services. Its studios and transmitter are located at the 3rd floor, Intellect Bldg., Perez Ave., Brgy. San Sebastian, Tarlac City.

References

External links
Love Radio Tarlac FB Page
Love Radio Tarlac Website

Radio stations in Tarlac
Radio stations established in 2014